Rev. Anderson B. Quay House is a historic home located  at Dillsburg, Pennsylvania, York County, Pennsylvania. It is a -story, "L"-shaped brick building. The original section was built in 1831, in the Greek Revival style.  About 1880, ornate exterior Italianate and Queen Anne elements were added. It features a shallow pitched roof, bracketed windows and door hoods, and a spindlework porch frieze.

It was added to the National Register of Historic Places in 1997.

References

Houses on the National Register of Historic Places in Pennsylvania
Greek Revival houses in Pennsylvania
Italianate architecture in Pennsylvania
Queen Anne architecture in Pennsylvania
Houses completed in 1880
Houses in York County, Pennsylvania
National Register of Historic Places in York County, Pennsylvania